Cholesteryl ester transfer protein (CETP), also called plasma lipid transfer protein, is a plasma protein that facilitates the transport of cholesteryl esters and triglycerides between the lipoproteins. It collects triglycerides from very-low-density (VLDL) or Chylomicrons and exchanges them for cholesteryl esters from high-density lipoproteins (HDL), and vice versa. Most of the time, however, CETP does a heteroexchange, trading a triglyceride for a cholesteryl ester or a cholesteryl ester for a triglyceride.

Genetics
The CETP gene is located on the sixteenth chromosome (16q21).

Protein Fold 
The crystal structure of CETP is that of dimer of two TUbular LIPid (TULIP) binding domains. Each domain consists of a core of 6 elements: 4 beta-sheets forming an extended superhelix; 2 flanking elements that tend to include some alpha helix. The sheets wrap around the helices to produce a cylinder 6 x 2.5 x 2.5 nm. CETP contains two of these domains that interact head-to-head via an interface made of 6 beta-sheets, 3 from each protomer. The same fold is shared by Bacterial Permeability Inducing proteins (examples: BPIFP1 BPIFP2 BPIFA3 and BPIFB4), phospholipid transfer protein (PLTP), and long-Palate Lung, and Nasal Epithelium protein (L-PLUNC). The fold is similar to intracellular SMP domains, and originated in bacteria. The crystal structure of CETP has been obtained with bound CETP inhibitors. However, this has not resolved the doubt over whether CETP function as a lipid tube or shuttle.

Role in disease
Rare mutations leading to reduced function of CETP have been linked to accelerated atherosclerosis. In contrast, a polymorphism (I405V) of the CETP gene leading to lower serum levels has also been linked to exceptional longevity and to metabolic response to nutritional intervention. However, this mutation also increases the prevalence of coronary heart disease in patients with hypertriglyceridemia. The D442G mutation, which lowers CETP levels and increases HDL levels also increases coronary heart disease.

Elaidic acid, a major component of trans fat, increases CETP activity.

Pharmacology

As HDL can alleviate atherosclerosis and other cardiovascular diseases, and certain disease states such as the metabolic syndrome feature low HDL, pharmacological inhibition of CETP is being studied as a method of improving HDL levels. To be specific, in a 2004 study, the small molecular agent torcetrapib was shown to increase HDL levels, alone and with a statin, and lower LDL when co-administered with a statin. Studies into cardiovascular endpoints, however, were largely disappointing. While they confirmed the change in lipid levels, most reported an increase in blood pressure, no change in atherosclerosis, and, in a trial of a combination of torcetrapib and atorvastatin, an increase in cardiovascular events and mortality.

A compound related to torcetrapib, Dalcetrapib (investigative name JTT-705/R1658), was also studied, but trials have ceased. It increases HDL levels by 30%, as compared to 60% by torcetrapib. Two CETP inhibitors were previously under development. One was Merck's MK-0859 anacetrapib, which in initial studies did not increase blood pressure. In 2017, its development was abandoned by Merck. The other was Eli Lilly's evacetrapib, which failed in Phase 3 trials.

Interactive pathway map

References

Further reading

External links 
 

Blood proteins